Carl Pedersen (27 March 1891 – 14 May 1964) was a Norwegian footballer. He played in two matches for the Norway national football team in 1913.

References

External links
 

1891 births
1964 deaths
Norwegian footballers
Norway international footballers
Sportspeople from Porsgrunn
Association football forwards